Dourgoulanga is a sub-prefecture of Ennedi Region in Chad.

References 

Populated places in Chad